This Land was a Canadian television series, which aired from 1970 to 1982 on CBC Television. Evolving from the earlier series This Land of Ours, a documentary series about Canada’s nature and resources, This Land expanded its focus to include environmental and conservation issues.

Hosts of the show included John Hopkins, Phyllis Gorman, Laurie Jennings, Mary Chapman, John Foster, Mike Halleran and Don Francks.

References

1970s Canadian documentary television series
CBC Television original programming
Environmental television
1970 Canadian television series debuts
1982 Canadian television series endings
1980s Canadian documentary television series